George Luther Robinson (22 February 1873 – 23 March 1930) was an English cricketer.  Robinson was a right-handed batsman who bowled leg break.  He was born in Ruddington, Nottinghamshire.

Robinson made his first-class debut for Nottinghamshire against Derbyshire in the 1896 County Championship.  During the 1896 season, he represented the county in 4 further first-class matches, the last of which came against Sussex.  In his 5 first-class matches, he scored 58 runs at a batting average of 8.28, with a high score of 17.  In the field he took 2 catches.  With the ball he took a single wicket at a bowling average of 24.00, with best figures of 1/14.

He died at Conisbrough, Yorkshire on 23 March 1930.

Family
His nephew Ellis Robinson played first-class cricket for Yorkshire and Somerset.

References

External links
George Robinson at Cricinfo
George Robinson at CricketArchive

1873 births
1930 deaths
People from Ruddington
Cricketers from Nottinghamshire
English cricketers
Nottinghamshire cricketers